AIDAmar is an Icarus-class cruise ship, built at Meyer Werft for AIDA Cruises. She is the sixth Sphinx series ship, preceded by sisters AIDAdiva, AIDAbella, AIDAluna, AIDAblu, AIDAsol and followed by AIDAstella. AIDAmar  was delivered to the shipping company by Meyer Werft on 3 May 2012.

AIDAmar was christened in Hamburg on 12 May 2012.

Concept and construction

AIDAmar was ordered on 13 December 2007 from Meyer Werft by Carnival Corporation & plc, the parent company of AIDA.

On 1 April 2012 AIDAmar was floated to Meyer Werft in Papenburg. Displaying a gauge 71,300 tons, it has 1,096 cabins. Facilities included are an additional deck, an onboard brewery and a  spa facility. The AIDAmar is a sister ship of AIDAblu and AIDAsol, delivered in 2010 and 2011 respectively. These ships are slightly larger than the first three series units, AIDAdiva, AIDAbella and AIDAluna (68,500 tons, 1,025 cabins), completed in 2007, 2008 and 2009 by Meyer Werft.
After leaving the hall building covered in Papenburg, AIDAmar went down the Ems River in mid-April to reach the North Sea and to conduct its tests before its release in May of the same year. The last ship of the class, the AIDAstella, was delivered by Meyer Werft in late 2013.

References

Ships of AIDA Cruises
2012 ships
Ships built in Papenburg